OCS 4: Get Stoved is the fourth studio album by American garage rock act Thee Oh Sees, released on May 30, 2005 on KimoSciotic Records. Released under the name, OCS, the album was recorded as a duo by John Dwyer and drummer Patrick Mullins, and features experimental freak folk songs.

The album was initially released as a double album, alongside the band's third studio album, Songs About Death & Dying Vol. 3, but was later released independently on KimoSciotic Records in 2008.

Reception
In a positive review for Allmusic, Alex Henderson wrote of the album's initial release as a double album with Songs About Death & Dying Vol. 3: "3 and 4 has more ups than downs, and Narnack Records deserves credit for documenting more than one side of Dwyer's artistry."

Track listing

Personnel

OCS
John Dwyer - vocals, guitar
Patrick Mullins - drums, electronics, vocals (12), bells

Additional musicians
Mike Donovan - backing vocals (4, 10, 13)
Matt Hartman - bass clarinet (7, 12)

Recording personnel
John Dwyer - recording

Artwork
Christopher Garret - cover and insert drawings

References

2005 albums
Oh Sees albums